The Church Street Historic District is a historic district in Dade City, Florida. The district runs along Church Street, between 9th and 17th Streets. On August 21, 1997, it was added to the U.S. National Register of Historic Places.

References

External links

 Pasco County listings at National Register of Historic Places

Gallery

Historic districts on the National Register of Historic Places in Florida
Dade City, Florida
National Register of Historic Places in Pasco County, Florida
1997 establishments in Florida